Chak Rakhwal railway station is a small railway station in Udhampur district, Jammu and Kashmir. Its code is SGRR. It serves Chak Rakhwal town. The station consists of two platforms. The platforms are not well sheltered. It lacks many facilities including water and sanitation.

Major trains 

No stoppage for any passenger train is listed in timetables. However, many trains stop for crossing purposes as it is a single line section.

Platforms

There are a total of 2 platforms and 3 tracks.

Station layout

See also

 Banihal railway station
 Jammu–Baramulla line
 Northern Railways
 List of railway stations in Jammu and Kashmir
 Udhampur–Jammu highway

References

External links

  Indian Railways

Railway stations in Udhampur district
Firozpur railway division